The University of Mount Union is a private university in Alliance, Ohio. Founded in 1846, the university was affiliated with the Methodist Church until the spring of 2019. In the fall of 2020, Mount Union had an enrollment of 1,958 undergraduate and 220 graduate students.

History

Mount Union was founded in 1846 by Orville Nelson Hartshorn  as "a place where men and women could be educated with equal opportunity, science would parallel the humanities, and there would be no distinction due to race, color, or sex." In approximately 1911, Scio College of Scio, Ohio, merged with Mount Union, moving faculty to the Mount Union campus and abandoning the Scio campus. Mount Union College was renamed the University of Mount Union effective August 1, 2010.

Academics
Eighty-five percent of the faculty at Mount Union have earned a doctoral degree or other terminal degree with graduate training at universities in the United States and Europe.

Mount Union offers 60 majors and 53 minors of academic coursework in keeping with the liberal arts tradition. The university also offers Pre-Professional programs in Pre-Health professions (Pre-Medicine), Pre-Law, and Pre-Ministry as well as Army ROTC. Mount Union offers a Master of Science in Physician Assistant studies, and a Doctor of Physical Therapy  and a Master of Arts in educational leadership.

Athletics

Mount Union school colors are purple and white and competes in the Ohio Athletic Conference and in NCAA Division III athletics. The teams are nicknamed Purple Raiders, and the school's mascot is MUcaw, a purple macaw.

Mount Union sponsors 12 men's varsity teams: baseball, basketball, cross-country, football, golf, track & field, soccer, swimming & diving, tennis, lacrosse, wrestling, and volleyball. The school also sponsors 10 women's varsity teams: basketball, cross-country, golf, lacrosse, track & field, soccer, softball, swimming & diving, tennis and volleyball.

Club sports include bowling, and intramural Sports include flag football, dodgeball, innertube water polo, ultimate frisbee, sand volleyball, 2 person golf scramble, men's basketball, women's basketball, softball, indoor soccer, indoor volleyball, 2 on 2 basketball, badminton, and pickleball.
Mount won the NCAA Men's Division III Cross Country Championship in 1974 under Coach Jim Wuske, the NCAA Men's Division III Indoor Track and Field Championships in 2017, and in 2014 & 2018 Mount Union won the NCAA Men's Division III Outdoor Track and Field Championships under Coach Kevin Lucas.

The men’s basketball team was retroactively named the pre-NCAA Tournament national champion in 1897-98 by the Premo-Porretta Power Poll.

Football

Mount Union's football is currently led by head coach Geoff Dartt. Mount Union has won a record 13 Division III national championships—all since 1993. Mount Union holds the all-division record for consecutive victories at 55 from 2000 to 2003, which ended with their loss to St. John's University (Collegeville, MN) in the Amos Alonzo Stagg Bowl (Division III National Championship) on December 20, 2003. Mount Union previously held the all divisions mark at 54 consecutive games until losing in the semifinals on December 12, 1999, to Rowan University (Glassboro, NJ). During both the 55 and 54 game streaks Mount Union won 3 consecutive National Championships. Since both streaks were connected—from 1997 to 2003 Mount Union won 109 of 110 games played. The Purple Raiders won 110 consecutive regular-season games between 1994 and 2005 (which was ended by conference foe Ohio Northern University on Oct 22, 2005), posted 14 undefeated regular seasons, won 16 Ohio Athletic Conference Championships, and had the best overall record in the 1990s (120–7–1, an overall winning percentage of 0.941).

National Championships: 1993, 1996, 1997, 1998, 2000, 2001, 2002, 2005, 2006, 2008, 2012, 2015, 2017
"Mount won the NCAA Men's Division III Cross Country Championship in 1974 under Coach Jim Wuske,
and in 2014 Mount Union won the NCAA Men's Division III Outdoor Track and Field Championships under Coach Kevin Lucas  ."

Student life
Mount Union's radio station is 91.1 WRMU, and the campus paper is The Dynamo.

The university's music program offers participation in numerous bands and choirs, including Concert Choir, Mount Union Alliance Chorale, Opera Workshop, Alliance Symphony Orchestra, Repertory Strings, Marching Band, The Raider Steel Band, Jazz Band, Percussion Ensemble, and more.

The Theatre Department puts on two productions every fall, and varying productions in the spring. Every spring semester alternates between a musical and a straight play every year for the main stage show, and every spring there are also student-directed one-acts. Theatre productions are open to all students, regardless of major or class rank.

Esports
In the Spring of 2019, the University of Mount Union started its Esports program by fielding its first Overwatch roster under head coach & director Derek Spinell, and is offering scholarships starting fall of 2019.

Currently, the University of Mount Union supports Overwatch, League of Legends, and Rocket League.

Greek life
There are four major social fraternities and four major social sororities with chapters at the institution.

Women's sororities
Alpha Xi Delta (Gamma chapter)
Alpha Chi Omega (Alpha Eta chapter)
Alpha Delta Pi (Gamma Theta chapter)
Delta Sigma Tau (Alpha chapter) (local)

Men's fraternities
Alpha Tau Omega (Alpha Nu chapter)
Sigma Alpha Epsilon (Ohio Sigma chapter)
Sigma Nu (Beta Iota chapter)
Phi Kappa Tau (Epsilon chapter)

Service fraternities
Alpha Phi Omega (Xi Upsilon chapter)
Kappa Phi (Women's Christian Sorority) (Alpha Psi chapter)
Sigma Theta Epsilon (Men's Christian Fraternity) (Delta chapter)
Kappa Kappa Psi (Honorary Band Fraternity) (Iota Lambda chapter)

Honor Societies
Alpha Psi Omega (Theatre) (Alpha Tau cast)
Kappa Kappa Psi (Band) (Iota Lambda chapter)
Kappa Pi (Art) (Zeta Alpha Sigma chapter)
Mu Phi Epsilon (Music) (Phi chapter)
Kappa Delta Pi (Education) (Omega Iota chapter)
Alpha Lambda Delta (First year)
Alpha Mu Gamma (Foreign Language)
Sigma Tau Delta (English) (Upsilon Upsilon chapter)
Tau Pi Phi (Accounting, Business, & Economics)
Psi Chi (Psychology)
Beta Beta Beta (Biology)
Pi Mu Epsilon (Mathematics)
Sigma Pi Sigma (Physics)
Sigma Iota Rho (International Studies)
Pi Sigma Alpha (Political Science)

People

References

External links

 

 
Private universities and colleges in Ohio
Universities and colleges affiliated with the United Methodist Church
Educational institutions established in 1846
Alliance, Ohio
1846 establishments in Ohio